is a Japanese football player. He plays for FC Maruyasu Okazaki.

Playing career
Yuki Matsumoto played for SC Sagamihara from 2011 to 2014. In 2015, moved to MIO Biwako Shiga. In 2016, he moved to FC Maruyasu Okazaki.

Club statistics
Updated to 20 February 2016.

References

External links

Profile at FC Maruyasu Okazaki

1989 births
Living people
Kokushikan University alumni
Association football people from Saitama Prefecture
Japanese footballers
J3 League players
Japan Football League players
SC Sagamihara players
MIO Biwako Shiga players
FC Maruyasu Okazaki players
Association football forwards